Atlantis is a legendary island first mentioned by Plato.

Atlantis may also refer to:

Entertainment

Books
 Atlantis (anthology), an anthology of themed fantasy and science fiction short stories
 Atlantis (novel), a 2005 novel by David Gibbins
 Atlantis, German novel by Gerhart Hauptmann 1912
 Atlantis (series), an alternate history trilogy by Harry Turtledove
 Atlantis (DC Comics), a location in DC Comics
 Atlantis (Marvel Comics), a location in Marvel Comics

Film
 Atlantis (franchise), a Disney media franchise
 Atlantis (1913 film), a Danish feature silent film
 Atlantis (1930 film), a French-language film directed by E. A. Dupont and Jean Kemm
 Atlantis (1991 film), a French documentary film by Luc Besson
 Atlantis (2019 film), a Ukrainian feature film by Valentyn Vasyanovych
 Atlantis, the Lost Continent, a 1961 American feature film by George Pal
 Atlantis: The Lost Empire, a 2001 animated Disney film

Games
 Atlantis (role-playing game), a fantasy role-playing game
 Atlantis (video game), a 1982 video game by Imagic
 Atlantis PbeM, a 1993 multi-player computer game
 Atlantis: The Lost Tales, a 1997 PC adventure game
 Atlantis Software, a British computer game publisher

Music

Bands
 Atlantis (German band), German blues/funkadelic/krautrock rock band of the 1970s

Albums
 Atlantis (Andrea Berg album), 2013
 Atlantis (Besieged album), 2007
 Atlantis: A Symphonic Journey (David Arkenstone album), 2004 
 Atlantis (Earth and Fire album), 1973
 Atlantis (F.I.R. album), 2011
 Atlantis (Lunatica album), 2001
 Atlantis (Wayne Shorter album), 1985
 Atlantis, a repackage of Shinee's album Don't Call Me, 2021
 Atlantis (Sun Ra album), 1969
 Atlantis (TNT album), 2008
 Atlantis (McCoy Tyner album), 1975
 Atlantis: Hymns for Disco, a 2006 k-os album
 Atlantis, a 2004 album by Atrocity

Songs
 "Atlantis" (instrumental), a 1963 instrumental by the Shadows
 "Atlantis" (Donovan song), 1968
 "Atlantis", a 2015 song by Seafret
 "Atlantis" (Bridgit Mendler song), 2016
 "Atlantis", a 1955 song by Les Baxter
 "Atlantis", a 2012 song by Ellie Goulding from Halcyon
 "Atlantis", a 2021 song by Noah Gundersen, featuring Phoebe Bridgers, from A Pillar of Salt
 "Atlantis", a song by Imperio
 "Atlantis", a 2021 song by Shinee

Television
 Atlantis (TV series), a 2013 British fantasy-adventure
 Atlantis (2011 film) (Atlantis: End of a World, Birth of a Legend), a 2011 BBC docudrama
 Atlantis, series episode, see list of Hercules: The Legendary Journeys episodes
 Atlantis, setting for the TV series Stargate Atlantis, see mythology of Stargate
 "Atlantis", an episode of season 2 of Phineas and Ferb

Places
 Atlantis (commune), a commune established in 1974 in Ireland that was moved to Colombia
 Atlantis, Florida, a city in Palm Beach
 Atlantis, Western Cape, a town in South Africa
 Atlantis basin, a region on the planet Mars
 Atlantis Massif, an undersea massif in the Atlantic Ocean
 Atlantis of the Sands

Resorts
 Atlantis (Wisconsin Dells), a resort hotel in Wisconsin
 Atlantis Casino Resort Spa, a resort in Reno, Nevada
 Atlantis Paradise Island, a resort in Nassau, Bahamas
 Atlantis, The Palm, a resort on Palm Jumeirah in Dubai, United Arab Emirates
 Atlantis Sanya, a resort in Sanya, China

Transportation

Air
 Atlantis Airlines (United States), a defunct airline of the United States
 Atlantis (Germany), a defunct airline of Germany
 Atlantis Airlines, a defunct airline of Senegal
 Air Atlantis, charter airline based in Portugal (1985–1993)
 Space Shuttle Atlantis, a retired NASA spacecraft

Sea
 Atlantis Submarines, a public passenger touring submarine fleet
 German auxiliary cruiser Atlantis, a 1937 German commerce raider of World War II
 HMS Atlantis (P432), a British submarine
 RV Atlantis (AGOR-25) (built 1994), a 1996 research vessel at Woods Hole
 RV Atlantis, a 1930 research vessel at Woods Hole Oceanographic Institution
 RV Atlantis II, a research vessel operated by Woods Hole until 1996
 USS Atlantis (SP-40), US Navy patrol boat (1917–1919)

Other
 1198 Atlantis, an asteroid
 Atlantis (market), a darknet market
 Atlantis (newspaper), a U.S. Greek language daily newspaper
 Atlantis (wrestler) (born 1962), Mexican masked professional wrestle
 Atlantis FC, a Finnish football club
 Atlantis Condominium, a condominium in Miami, Florida
 Atlantis Oil Field, an oil field in the Gulf of Mexico
 Atlantis PQ, a 2006 oil platform in the Gulf of Mexico

See also
 Atlantis (comics)
 Atlantis Hotel (disambiguation)
 New Atlantis (disambiguation)
 Atlantis-2, a transatlantic telephone cable
 Six Flags Atlantis, a defunct amusement park in south Florida
 Hearts in Atlantis, a collection of novellas and short stories by Stephen King